Telavi is a municipality of Georgia, in the region of Kakheti. Its administrative centre is Telavi. Telavi is an important transportation hub, industrial, agricultural (winemaking) and cultural center of Eastern Georgia.

History
Until 1917, the territory of the municipality was included in the Telavi Mazra of the Tbilisi province, and from 1930 it was formed as a separate district. It has been called a municipality since 2006, and the city of Telavi has been separated from the municipality since 2014. In 2017, the city of Telavi was deprived of the status of a self-governing city, joined the self-governing community and the Telavi municipality was created.

Administrative divisions and population

Telavi Municipality consists of 27 administrative units and 30 settlements. According to the National Statistics Office of Georgia, the population of Telavi Municipality as of 1 January 2021, is 55.1 thousand people. 19.8 thousand people live in urban areas and 35.4 thousand people in rural areas.
 Administrative unit of Old Telavi (part of Telavi); 
 Administrative unit of Central Telavi (part of Telavi);
 Administrative unit of West Telavi (part of Telavi);
 Administrative unit of Alazani-Caucasus (part of Telavi);
 Administrative unit of East Telavi (part of Telavi);
 Administrative unit of Akura;
 Administrative unit of Artana;
 Administrative unit of Busheti;
 Administrative unit of Gulgula;
 Administrative unit of Ikalto;
 Administrative unit of Karajala;
 Administrative unit of Kisiskhevi;
 Administrative unit of Kondoli;
 Administrative unit of Kurdghelauri;
 Administrative unit of Kvemo Khodasheni;
 Administrative unit of Lalisquri;
 Administrative unit of Lapanquri;
 Administrative unit of Napareuli;
 Administrative unit of Nasamkhrali;
 Administrative unit of Pshaveli (including Lechuri);
 Administrative unit of Ruispiri (including Akhateli);
 Administrative unit of Saniore (including Jughaani);
 Administrative unit of Shalauri;
 Administrative unit of Tetritsklebi (including Kobadze, Nadikvari, Serodani, Pantiani);
 Administrative unit of Tsinandali;
 Administrative unit of Vardisubani.

Settlements

Geography and climate

Telavi Municipality is bordered on the north and west by Akhmeta Municipality, on the northeast by the Republic of Dagestan, on the east by Kvareli Municipality, on the south-east by Gurjaani Municipality, and on the south-west by Sagarejo Municipality. A large part of the municipal lands is occupied by deciduous forests.

The territory of the municipality belongs to the district of moderately humid subtropical climate. The average annual air temperature is 12 °C, the amount of precipitation is 700–800 mm per year. The main hydrological artery of Telavi Municipality is formed by the Alazani River and its basin. The central part of Telavi Municipality is spread on the Alazani plain and is bordered on the south-west by the Gombori ridge, and on the northeast by the Kakheti Caucasus. The highest peak of Gombori ridge is cold (1991 m) on the territory of Telavi municipality.

Politics

Telavi Municipal Assembly is a representative body in Telavi Municipality. currently consisting of 36 members. The council is assembles into session regularly, to consider subject matters such as code changes, utilities, taxes, city budget, oversight of city government and more. Municipal Assembly and Mayor are elected every four-year. The last election was held in October 2021.

City Assembly 2017–2021

Education
There are 27 public and 1 private school as well as 32 nursery schools in the municipality. The number of pupils at schools is 8 728. There are 3 068 children enrolled in nursery schools.

There are 27 libraries (22 in the villages, 5 in the town), 1 youth house, 1 college, 1 university, 5 music schools, 1 professional music school and 1 art school in Telavi municipality.

Culture

There are 3 museums in the municipality (Telavi Historical Museum, House museum of Alexander Chavchavadze in Tsinandali and Qvevri and Qvevri Wine Museum in Napareuli), Vazha-Pshavela Professional State Drama Theater of Telavi, Ketevan Iashvili Art Gallery, Song and dance ensemble and a Cultural Center, which includes village culture houses, music bands – "Ghamurebi" (The Bats) and "Musikis Qalaqi" (City of music); Ensembles – "Tsinandali" and "Patara Kakhi"; Women's folk ensemble "Telavi", "Women's Trio" and women's chamber choir – "Kakhetis Hangebi".

Festivals and public holidays 
Various festivals visited by many international and local visitors are held throughout the municipality during the year.

Sport

A complex of Telavi tennis courts operates in Telavi Municipality. It combines 6 clay courts equipped with modern infrastructure and 2 artificial grass courts, where the training of athletes and international tournaments are held.

A football school "Telavi" is operating in Telavi Givi Chokheli Stadium.

The union of Sports Clubs Telavi operates in the Telavi Tamaz Antadze Sports Complex and includes basketball, rugby, handball, volleyball, rhythmic gymnastics, chess, sports shooting, billiards, and table tennis clubs.

Wrestling Sports School Telavi operates in Mirian Tsalkalamanidze Sports School and combines Georgian wrestling, judo, sambo, freestyle wrestling, karate, boxing, and arm wrestling.

The rugby stadium Caucasus Arena was built in Telavi in 2018, where the match of the European Championship was held.

Tourism

There is a Tourism Information Center in Telavi, which provides foreign and local visitors with the necessary information on tourist infrastructure, architectural and archeological monuments, cultural events, festivals, public holidays, protected areas, transport, and other interesting issues.

Number of visitors 
According to 2019 data, the total number of visitors to the hotels, museums (House Museum of Alexander Chavchavadze and Telavi Historical Museum), and the information center was 132,352 out of which 4647 visitors visited the "Telavi Tourism Information Center".

Types of tourism in the municipality
Cultural-religious tourism 
Wine tourism
Festival tourism
Gastronomy tourism
Agrotourism

Economy
The leading sectors of the economy are viticulture, horticulture, grain production, production of essential oils, meat, and milk. Important enterprises are wineries, family wineries, food, and light industry facilities. There is a railway line and a highway in the territory of the municipality.

Telavi Airport Mimino is located on the territory of Telavi Municipality, where the internship programs of the Georgian Aviation University are carried out.

Historical landmarks and sightseeing 

The architectural complex of Batonis Tsikhe located in the city of Telavi is a remarkable monument of cultural heritage with its architectural-historical features. The palace of King Erekle II is the only survived royal palace in Georgia.

The architectural complex includes the Palace of the Kakhetian Kings, a court church of Erekle II, a court church of King Archil, a castle fence, a bath, and a tunnel on the territory of the palace. Outside the fence is the largest bastion tower in Georgia.

A centuries-old plane tree (Platanus) stands in the center of the city of Telavi, the circumference of which reaches 12 meters. It is the largest plane tree in Georgia and is more than 900 years old.

Other notable architectural monuments include Vanta Palace Complex, Adamaant Castle, and others.

One of the architectural monuments in Telavi municipality is the Ikalto Monastery complex, which was founded by one of the Assyrian fathers Zenon Ikaltoeli in the 6th century. The old Shuamta Monastery is also noteworthy. The ensemble includes a 5th-century basilica, a domed and a small domed church. In the 16th century, the old Shuamta Monastery was emptied. The daughter of Tinatin Gurieli, the wife of King Levan II of Kakheti, founded a new monastery near Shuamta near her. In the village of Kisiskhevi stands the ancient (6th-7th centuries) Church of the Mother of God. Mamadaviti Monastery is located near the village of Akura. Monuments of historical significance are also preserved in the village of Ruispiri.

Lopota Lake is located on the territory of the municipality, around which the tourist infrastructure is developed: hotels, indoor and outdoor pools, fitness center, basketball and handball courts, mini-golf course, fishing area, stalls, Lopota Forest Spa, restaurants, Chateau Buera, Open bungalows and other entertainment facilities for both adults and children.

There are many wine and cheese companies, organic farms, and family wineries in Telavi Municipality, which are often visited by local and foreign visitors.

Historical sites include:

 Ikalto Monastery complex
 Old Shuamta
 Alexander Chavchavadze House-Museum of Tsinandali
Erekle II Palace (Telavi Historical-Ethnographic Museum)

Notable people

Twin towns – sister Municipalities
Telavi

 Anykščiai, Lithuania
 Balta, Ukraine
 Bešeňová, Slovakia
 Biberach an der Riss, Germany
 Hlybokaye, Belarus
 Kėdainiai, Lithuania
 Kletsk, Belarus
 Laoag, Philippines
 Shaki, Azerbaijan
 Talsi, Latvia
 Viljandi, Estonia

See also
 List of municipalities in Georgia (country)

References

External links
 Districts of Georgia, Statoids.com
 official site
 
 
 
 

Municipalities of Kakheti